The following events occurred in December 1937:

December 1, 1937 (Wednesday)
The Battle of Nanking began.
Japan recognized the Franco regime.
Otto Meissner entered the Hitler Cabinet as Minister of State and Head of the Chancellory.
Born: Chuck Low, actor, in New York City (d. 2017); Vaira Vīķe-Freiberga, 6th President of Latvia, in Riga, Latvia

December 2, 1937 (Thursday)
Ernst Rüdiger Starhemberg and Nora Gregor were married in Vienna.
Manchukuo and the Franco regime exchanged documents granting each other formal recognition.
In Burgos, the National Council of the FET was ceremonially sworn in. The new governing body was modeled after the Grand Council of Fascism in Italy.

December 3, 1937 (Friday)
Japanese forces took Danyang.
Neville Chamberlain appointed Harold MacMichael to be the next High Commissioner for Palestine to replace Sir Arthur Grenfell Wauchope, who was retiring for health reasons.
Born: Bobby Allison, race car driver and owner, in Miami, Florida

December 4, 1937 (Saturday)
The children's comic book The Dandy was first published in the United Kingdom, marking the first appearance of the character of Desperate Dan.
The political drama film First Lady starring Kay Francis was released.
Death of Sahibzada Abdul Qayyum Khan, an educationist and politician in British India

December 5, 1937 (Sunday)
The puppet state of the Great Way Municipal Government of Shanghai was created.
Emperor Hirohito's uncle Prince Yasuhiko Asaka took over command of the Japanese Shanghai Expeditionary Army besieging Nanking.
Yugoslavian Prime Minister Milan Stojadinović held talks with Benito Mussolini in Rome.

December 6, 1937 (Monday)
The U.S. Supreme Court decided Breedlove v. Suttles, James v. Dravo Contracting Co., Palko v. Connecticut and Puerto Rico v. Shell Co. (P.R.), Ltd.
Ford Frick was re-elected president of baseball's National League for another three-year term.
Born: Alberto Spencer, footballer, in Ancón, Ecuador (d. 2006)
Died: Francis Cadell, 54, Scottish Colourist painter

December 7, 1937 (Tuesday)
Alexandretta Crisis: Turkey renounced its May 1926 Treaty of Friendship with Syria and threatened war.
Japanese forces reached the walls of Nanking.
Austria banned several books critical of Nazism, including Rudolf Olden's book about Hitler.
The Boston Red Sox acquired the contract of 19-year old Ted Williams from the San Diego Padres of the Pacific Coast League. 
Born: Kenneth Colley, actor, in Manchester, England

December 8, 1937 (Wednesday)
Nationalist aircraft bombed Barcelona.
Eugen Weidmann was arrested by French police for murder. Weidmann shot one officer in the arm with a revolver, but the other officer managed to beat him down with a hammer.
The Brazilian football club Esporte Clube Flamengo was founded.
Born: Michael Bowen, artist, in Beverly Hills, California (d. 2009); James MacArthur, actor, in Washington, D.C. (d. 2010); Arne Næss, Jr., businessman and mountaineer, in Germany (d. 2004)
Died: Hans Molisch, 81, Czech-Austrian botanist

December 9, 1937 (Thursday)
The Japanese pushed into Nanking.
Joseph P. Kennedy accepted the post of United States Ambassador to the United Kingdom.
Born: Darwin Joston, actor, in Winston-Salem, North Carolina (d. 1998)
Died: Gustaf Dalén, 68, Swedish industrialist, inventor and Nobel laureate

December 10, 1937 (Friday)
The 1937 Nobel Prizes were awarded in Stockholm. The recipients were Clinton Davisson of the United States and George Paget Thomson of the United Kingdom for Physics, Norman Haworth (United Kingdom) and Paul Karrer (Switzerland) for Chemistry, Albert Szent-Györgyi (Hungary) for Physiology or Medicine and Roger Martin du Gard (France) for Literature. In Oslo, Robert Cecil (United Kingdom) was awarded the Peace Prize for his work at the League of Nations.
The Japanese Army pushed into Wuhu and Zhenjiang.
Castlecary rail accident: 35 people were killed in a train collision in Castlecary, Scotland.

December 11, 1937 (Saturday)
Italy quit the League of Nations.
The ocean liner President Hoover ran aground at Kasho-to off Taiwan. The 503 passengers would be evacuated and the ship declared a total loss.
The Toronto Argonauts edged the Winnipeg Blue Bombers 4-3 to win the 25th Grey Cup of Canadian football.
Born: Jim Harrison, author, in Grayling, Michigan (d. 2016)
Died: Seraphim Chichagov, 81, Russian Orthodox bishop (executed)

December 12, 1937 (Sunday)
The USS Panay incident took place when Japanese aircraft and shore batteries opened fire on the U.S. Navy gunboat Panay while it was evacuating personnel from the embassy at Nanking.
A legislative election was held in the Soviet Union. The Communist Party claimed 99.3% of the vote.
Mae West appeared on The Chase and Sanborn Hour with Edgar Bergen and performed a sexually suggestive "Adam and Eve" sketch. In one sequence, the snake in the Garden of Eden tries to squeeze through a fence as West exhorts: "Oh, shake your hips! ... Yeah, you're doing all right. Get me a big one, I feel like doing a big apple." West was unofficially banned from the radio for years afterward as a result.
The Washington Redskins beat the Chicago Bears 28-21 in the NFL Championship Game at Wrigley Field in Chicago.
The 1938 NFL draft was held. Corbett Davis was selected first overall by the Cleveland Rams.
Died: Alfred Abel, 58, German film actor, director and producer

December 13, 1937 (Monday)
The Battle of Nanking ended in Japanese victory. The Nanking Massacre began.
President Roosevelt demanded that Japan apologize for the Panay attack, render compensation and provide a guarantee that no such thing would happen again.
Pope Pius XI created five new cardinals.

December 14, 1937 (Tuesday)
The pro-Japanese Provisional Government of the Republic of China was established.
Local elections were held in the Philippines, marred by rioting around the country which killed 3 people. It was the first Philippine election in which women could vote.
The drama film Mannequin starring Joan Crawford and Spencer Tracy premiered in Westwood, Los Angeles.

December 15, 1937 (Wednesday)
The Battle of Teruel began.
An avalanche in Tirol, Austria killed 9 people.
Born: John Sladek, science fiction author, in Waverly, Iowa (d. 2000)

December 16, 1937 (Thursday)
Theodore Cole and Ralph Roe took part in the second known escape attempt from Alcatraz Federal Penitentiary. Their remains were never found and their fate is unknown.
Nazi Germany restricted the issuing of passports to Jews to exceptional cases such as emigration, traveling in the economic interest of Germany, serious illness or death.
Italy withdrew from the International Labour Organization.
The Noel Gay musical Me and My Girl opened at the Victoria Palace Theatre on London's West End.
Died: Ed Davis, 37, American criminal (executed by gas chamber)

December 17, 1937 (Friday)
Six new sections of the Autobahn totalling 218 km were opened.
Born: Kerry Packer, media tycoon, in Sydney, Australia (d. 2005)

December 18, 1937 (Saturday)
The Romanian pro-Fascist newspaper Țara Noastră ordered its readers to use every means to prevent Jews from voting in Monday's election. Jews were warned to stay away from the polls as their presence might provoke "reflex movements."
Died: Robert Worth Bingham, 66, American politician, judge, newspaper publisher and diplomat

December 19, 1937 (Sunday)
English author J. R. R. Tolkien wrote to C. A. Furth of Allen & Unwin, the firm which had published Tolkien's novel The Hobbit on September 21, saying, "I have written the first chapter of a new story about Hobbits - 'A long expected party'. A merry Christmas." This would become the first chapter of The Lord of the Rings.
Japanese Ambassador Hiroshi Saito made a radio address to the American people saying that the Panay attack was a "shocking blunder", and that Japan would be "only too anxious" to make amends.

December 20, 1937 (Monday)
General elections began in Romania with elections to the Chamber of Deputies. The National Liberal Party remained the largest party but lost an unexpectedly high number of seats.
Britain announced that Hughe Knatchbull-Hugessen would not return to his post as ambassador to China and that Archibald Clark Kerr, 1st Baron Inverchapel would take his place. 
There was a fire in a primary school in South Tonda (now Shirahama), Wakayama Prefecture, Japan while school children were watching a film. According to government documents, there were 81 fatalities.
Died: Erich Ludendorff, 72, German general

December 21, 1937 (Tuesday)
Battle of Teruel: Republicans captured parts of Teruel.
The Walt Disney animated film Snow White and the Seven Dwarfs premiered.
Born: Jane Fonda, actress, social activist and fitness instructor, in New York City
Died: Ted Healy, 41, American actor and comedian; Frank B. Kellogg, 80, American senator and Secretary of State

December 22, 1937 (Wednesday)
The French Social Party was banned in France. François de La Rocque and other leaders of the party were ordered by court to pay fines for reconstituting a political league that was supposed to have been dissolved.

December 23, 1937 (Thursday)
NBC Radio banned the mention of Mae West's name on all of its stations to avoid any possible revival of the "Adam and Eve" controversy. 
Born: Nelson Shanks, artist, in Rochester, New York (d. 2015)

December 24, 1937 (Friday)
The Japanese occupied Hangzhou.

December 25, 1937 (Saturday)
The Panay incident was closed when the United States formally accepted Japan's apologies.
Arturo Toscanini conducted the NBC Symphony Orchestra on the radio for the first time.
George VI delivered his first Royal Christmas Message. At four minutes it was the shortest Message to date.
Died: Newton D. Baker, 66, American politician and Secretary of War

December 26, 1937 (Sunday)
Romanian Prime Minister Gheorghe Tătărescu and his cabinet resigned after the National Liberal Party's disappointing performance in the December 20 elections.
Born: John Horton Conway, mathematician, in Liverpool, England (d. 2020)

December 27, 1937 (Monday)
The Japanese crossed the Yellow River and pushed into Shandong Province.
The Mongolia Garrison Army was raised.

December 28, 1937 (Tuesday)
Octavian Goga became Prime Minister of Romania.
Born: Ratan Tata, businessman, in Surat, British India
Died: Herbert Bullmore, 63, Australian-born Scottish rugby union player; Maurice Ravel, 62, French composer, pianist and conductor

December 29, 1937 (Wednesday)
The new Constitution of Ireland went into effect. The Irish Free State was abolished and the country was renamed simply "Ireland" or "Éire".
120,000 public service workers went on general strike in France. The strike was settled after one day.
Lou Thesz defeated Everett Marshall to win the vacant National Wrestling Association World Heavyweight Championship.
Born: Maumoon Abdul Gayoom, 3rd President of the Maldives, in Malé, Maldives; Dieter Thomas Heck, television presenter, singer and actor, in Flensburg, Germany (d. 2018); Barbara Steele, actress, in Birkenhead, England

December 30, 1937 (Thursday)
Farouk of Egypt ousted Mustafa el-Nahhas as Prime Minister and replaced him with Muhammad Mahmoud Pasha and a cabinet that included several pro-Italians. Rioting broke out in several districts of Cairo by demonstrators angry at the replacement.
Born: Gordon Banks, footballer, in Sheffield, England (d. 2019); John Hartford, folk, country and bluegrass musician, in New York City (d. 2001); Jim Marshall, NFL defensive end, in Wilsonville, Boyle County, Kentucky; Paul Stookey, singer-songwriter (Peter, Paul and Mary), in Baltimore, Maryland
Died: Hans Niels Andersen, 85, Danish shipping magnate and founder of the East Asiatic Company

December 31, 1937 (Friday)
Octavian Goga addressed the Romanian people in a radio broadcast in which he outlined a series of antisemitic measures he intended to introduce against the country's Jews, whom he accused of having "exploited" Romania after entering "illegally" after the war.
Born: Avram Hershko, Hungarian-born Israeli biochemist and Nobel laureate, in Karcag; Sir Anthony Hopkins, actor, in Port Talbot, Wales

References

1937
1937-12
1937-12